Richard Paul Smith (born 30 August 1972) is an Irish cricket umpire. He has stood in six ODI games between 2012 and 2014 and in six Twenty20 Internationals in 2012.

See also
 List of One Day International cricket umpires
 List of Twenty20 International cricket umpires

References

1972 births
Living people
Irish One Day International cricket umpires
Irish Twenty20 International cricket umpires
Sportspeople from Guildford